George Bastl and Chris Guccione were the reigning champions; however, Bastl retired in 2009 and Guccione chose to participate in Baton Rouge instead.Nicolas Mahut and Lovro Zovko won in the final 6–2, 6–2 against Raven Klaasen and Izak van der Merwe.

Seeds

Draw

Draw

References
 Doubles Draw

Soweto Open - Doubles
2010 Men's Doubles